The Swedish Horseman (Swedish: Svenske ryttaren) is a 1949 historical drama film directed by Gustaf Edgren and starring Elisabeth Söderström, Kenne Fant and Åke Söderblom. It was shot at the Råsunda Studios in Stockholm and on location in Uppsala and Torekov. It was inspired by Leo Perutz's 1936 novel The Swedish Rider.

Cast
 Elisabeth Söderström as Agneta von Kreschwitz
 Kenne Fant as 	Jacob
 Åke Söderblom as	Stenius
 Gunnel Broström as 	Svarta Lisa
 Harry Ahlin as 	Saltza
 Magnus Kesster as 	Bailiff
 Sture Ericson as 	Mickel
 Barbro Nordin as 	Margareta
 Tommy Blomquist as Karl
 Ingemar Pallin as 	Christian von Thornefeldt
 Wiktor Andersson as 	Cup-Bearer
 Tor Borong as 	Cavalry Captain
 Olle Ek as 	Servant
 Gull Natorp as 	Countess Gyllencrona
 Anna-Stina Wåglund as 	Kerstin

References

Bibliography 
 Qvist, Per Olov & Von Bagh, Peter . Guide to the Cinema of Sweden and Finland. Greenwood Publishing Group, 2000.

External links 
 

1949 films
1949 drama films
1940s Swedish-language films
Films directed by Gustaf Edgren
Swedish historical drama films
1940s historical drama films
Films set in the 18th century
1940s Swedish films